Ron Lopez (born August 21, 1970) is a former American football quarterback who spent the summer of 1999 with the NFL San Diego Chargers and played eight seasons in the Arena Football League with the Iowa Barnstormers, Anaheim Piranhas, Florida Bobcats, San Jose SaberCats, Portland Forest Dragons/Oklahoma Wranglers and Carolina Cobras. He first enrolled at Glendale College before transferring to Utah State University. He attended Franklin High School in Los Angeles, California.

Professional career
Lopez played for the Iowa Barnstormers from 1995 to 1996, where he was the backup to Kurt Warner. Lopez was traded to the Anaheim Piranhas for Nathan Burchette in March 1997. Lopez was named the starting quarterback for the Piranhas' opening game against the New Jersey Red Dogs. He signed with the Florida Bobcats on June 12, 1997. Lopez played for the San Jose SaberCats in 1998, recording 47 touchdowns on 2,769 passing yards. He played for the Portland Forest Dragons in 1999, recording 38 touchdowns on 25,74 passing yards. Attended Camp the summer of 1999 with the San Diego Chargers before rejoining the Portland Forrest Dragons who moved to Oklahoma in 2000. He recorded 90 touchdowns on 5,367 passing yards for the Oklahoma Wranglers from 2000 to 2001. Lopez signed with the Carolina Cobras on March 8, 2003.

Personal life
Lopez was diagnosed with Non-Hodgkin lymphoma in February 2007 and declared cancer-free in August 2007.

References

External links
Just Sports Stats
College stats

Living people
1970 births
Players of American football from Los Angeles
American football quarterbacks
Glendale Vaqueros football players
Utah State Aggies football players
Iowa Barnstormers players
Anaheim Piranhas players
Florida Bobcats players
San Jose SaberCats players
Portland Forest Dragons players
Oklahoma Wranglers players
Carolina Cobras players
Franklin High School (Los Angeles) alumni
Wichita Stealth players